The Tertiary Scholarship and Loans Service (TSLS) is a statutory body in Fiji that provides funding through scholarships and loans for Fijians to undertake studies in tertiary and vocational education. It was established in 2014 under the jurisdiction of the Ministry of Education funded by the Government of Fiji.

History 
TSLS was established in 2014 and has assisted more than 50,000 Fijian students. Prime Minister Frank Bainimarama declared that the government will continue to play an important role in the education of students. As of March 2022, more than 12,000 students are currently on TSLS. TSLS has revealed that more than $500 million is owed by students and only $23 million has been paid back.

Schemes 
TSLS provides two schemes; Scholarship and Loan. Under the Scholarship scheme, TSLS provides local and overseas scholarships as well as for students with special needs. The Loan scheme are funded in the form of loans that are not normal debts. Since its establishment, the Government has paid out $1.2 billion for the schemes.

Scholarship 
Also known as NTS (National Toppers Scholarship), these are fully funded scholarships for the top ranked students who have completed Year 13 (Thirteenth grade). To qualify, students should score more than 300/400 in the Fiji Year 13 Examination, however cut off marks vary in different prioritized areas. As of 2022, the total number of scholarships funded by the government is 480.

Loan 
Also known as TELS (Tertiary Education Loans Scheme), these are funds in the form of loans which provides students with zero interest rates limited to the first Bachelor's degree. To qualify, students should score more than 280/400 in the Fiji Year 13 Examination. As of 2022, the total number of loan schemes funded is 7,000 spread out to Bachelor's degree and Academic certificate.

See also 

 Education in Fiji

References 

Education in Fiji
Educational organisations based in Fiji